Sir John Henry Maden  (11 September 1862 – 18 February 1920) was a British Liberal Party  politician. He was elected Member of Parliament for Rossendale in 1892, resigning in 1900 by becoming Steward of the Manor of Northstead. He was again reelected for Rossendale in a 1917 by-election, retiring from politics when he lost his seat in the 1918 general election.

Maden was the head of the firm of John Maden & Sons, cotton spinners and manufacturers of Bacup and Manchester. He was an honorary freeman of Bacup of which he had been mayor thirteen times in all, eleven times in succession. He served as High Sheriff of Lancashire in 1914 and was knighted the following year. He was also a Justice of the Peace.

References

External links 
 

1862 births
1920 deaths
UK MPs 1892–1895
UK MPs 1895–1900
UK MPs 1910–1918
Knights Bachelor
Liberal Party (UK) MPs for English constituencies
Mayors of places in Lancashire
Politicians awarded knighthoods
English justices of the peace
High Sheriffs of Lancashire
People from Bacup